Bass Brothers is the professional name for the team of Mark and Jeff Bass, the Detroit producers responsible for helping Eminem with his early career and collaborating on much of his subsequent music. Before that, they worked with George Clinton. Tracks from those sessions ended up on the P-Funk All Stars album Dope Dogs. Jeff Bass is considered one of the most influential people in Eminem's career. On their work with Eminem, Mark and Jeff Bass are credited as F.B.T. Productions.

Work
Although Interscope Records marketed Dr. Dre as Eminem's major producer, the Bass Brothers have in fact produced more individual tracks for Eminem than Dr. Dre. Jeff Bass performed the "Public Service Announcements" that introduce both The Slim Shady LP and The Marshall Mathers LP. Most recently, he performed the "Another Public Service Announcement" from D12's album Devil's Night when he got punched by Rondell Beene, who replaces him as the announcer for that album.

Most of Eminem's hit singles have been either produced by Dre ("My Name Is", "The Real Slim Shady", and "Just Lose It") or Jeff Bass ("Without Me", "Beautiful", and "Lose Yourself").

Both have won Grammy Awards for their work with Eminem. Jeff Bass won a Best Original Song Oscar in 2003 for co-writing "Lose Yourself" from the film 8 Mile.

The Bass Brothers also own a Detroit record label called Web Entertainment, home to both rock artists (The Romantics) and hip-hop acts (King Gordy).

Mark Bass: "In 1990, Jeffrey and I landed a deal to produce a hip-hop rap project called Tycie & Woody for Elektra Records, operating for the first time as the 'Funky Bass Brothers [later changing to F.B.T. (Funky Bass Team) due to the addition of Mike Wilder to the team].' We met George Clinton and started working as a production team for George and for his label, Westbound Records. Unfortunately, most of the acts that we produced for Westbound were never released, and we feel it was some of our best work. Generally speaking, we always worked with black artists, although not intentionally. That changed, of course, when Mark heard a white rapper named M&M freestyle on a local radio show in 1992 and invited him to the studio for free time."

The song "Touchdown" off T.I.'s album T.I. vs. T.I.P. released in 2007, featuring Eminem was produced by Eminem and Jeff Bass. Mark produced George Clinton's album, George Clinton and His Gangsters of Love released September 16, 2008. In 2009 Jeff co-produced the fifth single "Beautiful" off Eminem's album Relapse.

Although the brothers no longer do significant production for Eminem, the rapper has stated that they maintain a positive and close relationship.

IPO announcement 
In September 2017, the Bass Brothers and manager Joel Martin announced a plan to sell either 15% or 25% of their sound recording royalties, including their interest in the 1999 – 2013 Eminem catalog, to a company called Royalty Flow. Royalty Flow, a subsidiary of Royalty Exchange, filed under SEC Regulation A+ to conduct an equity crowdfunding campaign to raise the money needed to buy the catalog.

Business ventures
 Bassmint Productions
 Mashin' Duck Records
 Web Entertainment

Discography

See also
F.B.T. Productions, LLC v. Aftermath Records

References

American hip hop record producers
Grammy Award winners for rap music
Eminem
Record production duos
Songwriters from Michigan
American musical duos
Sibling musical duos
Hip hop duos
Shady Records artists
Jewish hip hop record producers